Baphia longipedicellata is a species of plant in the family Fabaceae. Subspecies keniensis is found only in Kenya and is threatened by habitat loss.

References

longipedicellata
Flora of Kenya
Vulnerable plants
Endemic flora of Kenya
Taxonomy articles created by Polbot
Taxa named by Émile Auguste Joseph De Wildeman